This is a listing of the shorts, feature films, television programs, and television specials in the Looney Tunes and Merrie Melodies cartoon series, extending from 1929 through the present day. Altogether, 1,002 animated shorts alone were released under the Looney Tunes and Merrie Melodies banners from the 1930s through the 1960s (1000 official and 2 cut downs). From the beginning to the present day, 1,041 theatrical shorts have been created.

1920s–1930s 

A total of 270 shorts were produced and released during the 1930s.
Additionally at least one short was produced in the 1930s, but never publicly released in theaters. A private Warner Bros end-of-year blooper reel with animated sequences featuring Porky Pig was included. This reel was never screened in theaters. A theatrical feature included an animated sequence featuring a Porky Pig lookalike.

1940s 

A total of 307 shorts were produced and theatrically released in the 1940s. Additionally, Bugs Bunny was featured in government-sponsored short for U.S. Department of the Treasury, but he also made a cameo appearance a Puppetoon short and in two Warner Bros. live-action features.

1950s 

A total of 278 shorts were produced and theatrically released in the 1950s. There were no additional shorts produced during the decade.

1960s 

A total of 147 shorts were released during the 1960s; additionally, an unaired television cartoon pilot featuring the Road Runner was theatrically screened instead.

1970s–present

Since the end of the regular production of the series in 1969, Warner Bros. has occasionally produced new Looney Tunes shorts that have been released theatrically.

Feature films

Television series

Television specials

Further reading 
 Looney Tunes and Merrie Melodies: A Complete Illustrated Guide to the Warner Bros. Cartoons, by Jerry Beck and Will Friedwald (1989), Henry Holt, 
 Chuck Amuck: The Life and Times of an Animated Cartoonist by Chuck Jones, published by Farrar Straus & Giroux, 
 That's Not All, Folks! by Mel Blanc, Philip Bashe. Warner Books,  (Softcover)  (Hardcover)
 Of Mice and Magic: A History of American Animated Cartoons, Leonard Maltin, Revised Edition 1987, Plume  (Softcover)  (Hardcover)

See also 
 Looney Tunes
 Merrie Melodies
 Warner Bros.
 Looney Tunes Golden Collection
 The Golden Age of Looney Tunes

References

External links 
 The Big Cartoon DataBase entry for Merrie Melodies Cartoons and for Looney Tunes Cartoons
 Golden Age Cartoons' The Ultimate Looney Tunes and Merrie Melodies Website by Jon Cooke
 Official site

Complete single-page filmographies 
 Looney Tunes Checklist
 Complete LT/MM Filmography

 
 
Looney Tunes and Merrie Melodies
Looney Tunes and Merrie Melodies